Crowdon is a village in the Scarborough district of North Yorkshire, England.

References

Villages in North Yorkshire